Buildings named Sun Yat-Sen Memorial Hall are located in:

 Sun Yat-sen Memorial Hall (Guangzhou)
 Sun Yat-sen Memorial Hall (Taipei)
 A building in the Chinese Cultural Garden in San Jose, California
 Sun Yat-sen Mausoleum in Nanjing